List of Indian airlines currently operating

Mainline

Scheduled Commuter

Cargo

Charter

See also
 List of airports in India
 List of airlines
 List of defunct airlines of India
 List of pilot training institutes in India

References

External links
 https://www.dgca.gov.in/digigov-portal/
 https://www.flightconnections.com/

India
Airlines
Airlines
India